Pilottone (or Pilotone) and the related neo-pilottone are special synchronization signals recorded by analog audio recorders designed for use in motion picture production, to keep sound and vision recorded on separate media in step. Before the adoption of timecode by the motion picture industry in the late 1980s, pilottone-sync was the basis of all professional magnetic motion picture sound recording systems, whereas most amateur film formats used pre-striped magnetic coating on the film itself for live-sound recording.

History 

According to Carsten Diercks, camera operator and filmmaker at West-German Nordwestdeutscher Rundfunk (NWDR) during the 1950s, pilottone was invented at the NWDR studio in Hamburg-Lokstedt, West Germany by NWDR technical engineer Adalbert Lohmann and his assistant Udo Stepputat in the early 1950s for single-camera 16mm TV news gathering and documentaries. The first program featuring the use of pilottone was the documentary Musuri - Es geht aufwärts am Kongo ("Musuri: Upstream/progress at the Congo"), shot in early 1954 in Africa and first broadcast on ARD on March 31, 1954. The new technology required new editing suites, and Musuri camera operator Diercks turned to a small nearby 6-man workshop named Steenbeck. The subsequent success of priorly shunned 16mm for TV program gathering facilitated by the pilotone system turned Steenbeck into a multinational corporation.

Neo-pilottone was invented in 1957 by Stefan Kudelski with the Nagra III tape recorder.

The new technology of pilottone was brought to international attention by its use by Richard Leacock, former cameraman of filmmaker Robert Flaherty, in his documentary feature Primary (1960), documenting the competing Democratic presidential nominee candidates Hubert Humphrey and John F. Kennedy. Diercks himself helped the spread of pilottone in the USA when he was the only Western reporter allowed to shoot in Havana during the Bay of Pigs Invasion in April 1961. CBS secured the licensing rights to Diercks's material via Norddeutscher Rundfunk (NWDR had split in 1956 into NDR and WDR), and brought it on air on May 14, 1961, ten days prior to the German broadcast of the same material. At a time when North-American TV program gathering was dominated by either Movietone (see also Movietone News) or magnetic pre-striping for live-sound recording, and the use of pilottone was still unheard of, according to Diercks the US TV networks were impressed with the system demonstrated by the 60-minute documentary feature.

Technology 

The synchronization is obtained when a pulse cable is connected from Motion picture camera to an audio recorder such as those made by Nagra. A camera with a Sync motor sends a 60/50 Hz signal to the recorder, which is recorded as a sine wave pilot tone.

The recorder has a double recording head, similar to a two-track recorder. Each of the two cores of the recording head records both the audio signal, and the pilot tone. The audio signal to be recorded is applied identically to both cores of the recording head, and the pilot tone sine wave is applied in a push-pull arrangement (180 degrees out-of-phase).

Unlike the recording head, the playback head has a single core.  The playback head gap covers both of the tracks created by the record head. The magnetic field changes across the width of the gap are effectively added in the playback head, so the playback head reproduces the audio signal, which is the same in both tracks. But the pilot tone cancels itself in the playback head: at a point on the tape where it has a certain intensity on the upper track, it has the opposite intensity on the lower track, and so always sums to zero.

On playback, the record head is used as a push-pull playback head in order to reproduce the pilot tone. All speed variations of the camera and tape can be detected as deviations from 60/50 Hz, and compared at the time of playback with in built quartz reference oscillator. For cinematic audio, speed variations are rectified (resolved) at the time of transfer to the perforated 35mm/16mm audio tape. At that time the mains power supply frequency is also taken as reference. (The selection of the 60/50 Hz equipment depends on the power supply in the country where filming is being conducted. North America has a supply of 60 Hz whereas Europe and some Asian countries have 50 Hz.) 

Normal audio tape recorders have good regulation of tape speed, but not sufficiently precise to guarantee that a playback machine will exactly match the speed of the recorder over long periods of time. Such a system would need to record exactly how much tape passes the head in such an amount of time, and would have to be accurate to a quarter inch after 800 feet or more. Pilottone provides such a system.

When the tape is played back on a pilottone-reading tape player, it needs to only resolve the pilottone signal on the tape. The player has a quartz oscillator of its own, and when the operator hits play, the player tries to match the sine wave of the recorded pilottone with the pilottone being generated by its own quartz crystal.  When they match up, the player knows that the tape is moving across its play head exactly as fast as it was across the record head when it was originally recorded.

Obsolescence 
The pilottone system became obsolete in the 1980s when the virtually universal use of crystal controlled motors on cameras, and crystal controlled digital frequency sampling on audio recorders assured accurate synchronization of picture and sound. 

With the speed of both camera and recorder free of significant variation there is no longer a need for a synchronization cable to connect them. This has made the work of a sound technician much simpler. It also allows more freedom of camera movement during filming.

Also, the use of SMPTE time code on source recordings simplifies finding match points in post production between picture and audio in both the film and television worlds.

See also
Cinéma vérité
Direct Cinema
Pilot signal

References

External links 
Interview with pilottone pioneer Carsten Diercks (3:17 min, RealMedia; in German), with excerpts from Musuri - Es geht aufwärts am Kongo (1954), world's first use of pilottone
Small illustrated biography of Carsten Diercks at Filmmuseum Hamburg (in German)

Film and video technology
Synchronization

de:Pilotton